is a retired Japanese professional footballer who played for FC Gifu.

Club statistics
Updated to 2 February 2020.

References

External links 
Profile at FC Gifu

Facebook Profile

1991 births
Living people
Tokyo International University alumni
Association football people from Tokyo Metropolis
People from Kokubunji, Tokyo
Japanese footballers
J2 League players
FC Gifu players
Association football defenders